Brian Wilson: I Just Wasn't Made for These Times is a 1995 biographical musical film directed by Don Was, centered on Brian Wilson of the Beach Boys. Through interviews with Brian and the Wilson family, the documentary examines the ups and downs of Wilson's life, including the early years of the Beach Boys, his years of substance abuse, and his long road to recovery. A soundtrack, I Just Wasn't Made for These Times, accompanied its release.

Its name derives from the Beach Boys' song "I Just Wasn't Made for These Times", released on Pet Sounds (1966). According to Was, he created the documentary to enlighten "non-musicians" of the significance of Wilson's work and to explain why the phrase "Brian Wilson is a genius" had become "holy gospel" among musicians.

For the 2014 biopic Love and Mercy, director Bill Pohlad cast John Cusack as Wilson based on the real Wilson's mannerisms and appearance in I Just Wasn't Made for These Times. Cusack later recommended the documentary  as a "companion piece" to the biopic.

Cast

External links

References

1995 films
1995 documentary films
American music history
American documentary films
Brian Wilson
Films about the Beach Boys
Lionsgate films
Rockumentaries
Documentary films about singers
1990s English-language films
1990s American films